La Brea Woman is a human whose remains were found in the La Brea Tar Pits in Los Angeles, California. The remains, first discovered in the pits in 1914, are the partial skeleton of a woman. At around 18–25 years of age at death, she has been dated at 10,220–10,250 years BP (Before Present). These are the only human remains to have ever been discovered at the La Brea Tar Pits.

Archaeological study
Researchers estimate that the woman was about 18–25 years old when she died and was a height of about 4 feet, 8–10 inches (1.5 meters). Judging by her dental samples, scientists suggest she ate a diet of stone-ground meal. Her skull was fractured, which researchers infer was caused by a blow to the head, which may have killed her.

Museum display
The remains consisted of a cranium, mandible, and post-cranial remains, and were recovered from Pit 10 at the Rancho La Brea tar pits.

They used to be on display in the George C. Page Museum, alongside a life-sized model thought to resemble the woman, but the exhibit was removed around 2004. Curator John M. Harris was concerned that this display of historic remains might offend Native Americans or attract unwanted attention to its Native American origins, thereby triggering a demand for their return. According to some researchers, her skull shape indicates that she is ethnically Chumash. However, others claim that this suggestion is "baseless" and that there is not enough information to reliably determine this.

In 2009, California forensic artist Melissa R. Cooper created a facial reconstruction based on her skull. The images resulted in controversy regarding their display in addition to ethical questions about the museum's reason for keeping La Brea Woman in hiding.

Associated dog remains
Human bones were found associated with remains of a domestic dog, and so were interpreted to have been ceremonially interred. However, in 2016, it was discovered that the dog remains were only 3,000 years old, disproving the idea that it was ceremonially interred with her.

See also 
List of human evolution fossils
List of unsolved deaths
Angeles Mesa skeletons

References

External links
 Cooper's Facial Reconstructions of the La Brea Woman

1914 archaeological discoveries
1914 in science
Woman
Native American history of California
Oldest human remains in the Americas
Unsolved deaths
History of Los Angeles County, California